Suzhou High School, officially the Suzhou High School of Jiangsu Province, is a Chinese public high school of one-millennium rich history, located in Suzhou, Jiangsu. In AD 1035, the Northern Song politician and writer Fan Zhongyan founded the predecessor of Suzhou High school, Suzhou Prefecture School.

During the Qing dynasty, Zhang Boxing established the Ziyang College inside the Suzhou Prefecture School. It was one of the most prestigious colleges in the nation, and several emperors of the Qing dynasty praised its achievements. In the 1900s, the imperial examination was abandoned, and consequently Duan Fang, the governor of Jiangsu, transformed the school into a modern school. He also invited sinology masters Wang Guowei and Luo Zhenyu to join the faculty of the school. In addition, during the Republic of China period, Zhang Taiyan and Qian Mu taught sinology here. It is widely regarded as one of the four most famous high school in Jiangnan.

After the establishment of People's Republic of China, Suzhou High School became one of the 24 key high schools of China in 1953, which is selected by the Ministry of Education, and one of the top four high schools in Jiangsu Province as well. In 1997, Suzhou High School became the first batch of national model high school in Jiangsu Province. After the key school concept was abolished, it became four-starred high school in 2004. In a 2016 ranking of Chinese high schools that send students to study in American universities, Suzhou High School ranked number 39 in mainland China in terms of the number of students entering top American universities.

History

Suzhou Prefecture School

In 1035, Fan Zhongyan, the prime minister of the Northern Song dynasty founded the Suzhou Prefecture School, which is the first time in Chinese history that combined prefecture school with Confucian temple. The same year, Fan Zhongyan donated a house, and began the construction of quasi-government school after the approval of the Emperor Ren Zong. Then he employed the educator Hu Yuan, the implementor of "sub-Studio" teaching style. Since then, with the school in Suzhou, Suzhou High School began the "Millennium Prefecture School"(千年府学) of history.

Ziyang College
During the Qing dynasty, Zhang Boxing (张伯行) established the Ziyang College (紫阳书院) in the Suzhou Prefecture School. At that time, most of the governmental schools are examination-oriented while the Ziyang College focused on Neo-Confucianism. Zhang also engaged famous teachers from all over the country and the college attracted students nationwide. In 1860, Suzhou Prefecture School was seriously damaged in the catastrophe of Taiping Rebellion. Fourteen years later, governor Zhang Shusheng (张树声) arranged a huge budget in its reconstruction.

During the late Qing dynasty and ROC

In 1902, Ziyang College was renamed to Xiaoshiguan (校士馆, literally meaning a place for school scholars). Two years later, Duan Fang (端方), the provincial governor of Jiangsu, established Jiangsu Normal School (江苏师范学堂) on its campus. He invited sinology great masters Luo Zhenyu and Wang Guowei to the school, serving as principal and teacher respectively. After that, the renowned elite college in Jiangnan became a public high school.

In 1911, the school was renamed to Jiangsu Provincial No.1 Normal School (江苏省立第一师范学校). During May Fourth Movement, students in the school established a student council with some universities to protest the signing of the Treaty of Versailles. In mid-May, the students' strike finally affected the government's decision. In 1927, Wang Maozu, an educationist who studied at Harvard University and Columbia University and former principal of Beijing Normal University, became the principal of Jiangsu Provincial Suzhou High School. After that, he modified the English name of this school to Soochow Academy. He invited some famous scholars, including Qian Mu, Zhang Taiyan and Lü Shuxiang.

After Wang resigned in 1931, Jiangsu Province Department of Education let geographer Hu Huanyong at National Central University to take this position temporarily. In July 1932, SHS started to admit girls, which is considered as a progress in China at that time. In the 1st Jiangsu Provincial High School Graduate Examination held in 1933, SHS students attracted nationwide attention by having 24 of them ranked in Top 100 in the province. Two years later, Hu Huanyong returned to National Central University after the negotiation of university and the Department of Education.

On November 19, 1937, the Japanese Army invaded Suzhou and occupied the campus of Suzhou High School. During the 8-year war, the school relocated seven times and changed its name twice, in order to minimize attention. After the fall of Suzhou, SHS initially moved to rural Yixing—the Suzhou High School at Boyang (亳阳苏中). The students and faculty members had to change their campus again when Japanese occupied the whole Sunan (Southern Jiangsu) region. The Suzhou High School at Shanghai (苏中沪校) was located at Fuzhou Road, Shanghai International Settlement. On December 8, 1941, the U.S. declared war upon Japan and the Japanese Army eventually annexed the International Settlement. As a result, SHS moved to Changzhou ("Private Qingyun School", 私立青云), Yixing("Private Hongyi School", 私立弘毅), though in the name of private schools. In October 1945, Suzhou High School finally returned to its original campus after the surrender of Japan. During the 1940s and 1950s, Suzhou High School continued to be one of China's top high schools, with 40-50 students admitted by Peking University, Tsinghua University and Jiaotong University each year. Despite this, the high-level academic atmosphere comparable with top universities no longer existed. During the Chinese Communist Revolution, the People's Liberation Army occupied Suzhou on April 27, 1949 and the Communist Party took over the school.

During PRC

Today
In 1978, the school was named as a high school in Suzhou, Jiangsu Province, and became the first school to restore one of the key secondary schools.

In 1985, the school and the University of Science and Technology co-founded the Junior Class College preparatory classes.

It established friendly relations and cooperation with schools in Japan, Singapore, United Kingdom, the United States, Canada, Australia, New Zealand and other countries more than 10 universities (such as the Massachusetts Institute of Technology, Waseda University, Japan) . In 2007, Suzhou High School introduced the Cambridge International High School program.

Founded in 1996, the Suzhou Lida Middle School was transformed in 2005 into the state-controlled joint-venture Suzhou Lida school. The Suzhou High School Park affiliate was founded in 2003 and located in Suzhou Industrial Park.

In 2004, the school was classified as a four-star high school in Jiangsu Province. For three consecutive years since 1999, the CPC Jiangsu Provincial Committee and Jiangsu Provincial People's Government awarded the "Civilized Unit of Jiangsu Province pacesetter" honor.

Teachers
Suzhou High School has five professors for senior secondary school teachers and 19 grade teachers in-service provincial team.

Campus

It is located on Sanyuan Fang (三元坊) of Renmin Road in Suzhou. Its ground occupy an area of 160 mu(1 mu = 666.67 square meters).

The teaching areas of Suzhou High School surrounds the Daoshan Hill (道山). The symbol of Suzhou High School is the Science Building facing the main gate near Renmin Road. The main teaching buildings are the East and West red buildings (西红楼, 东红楼) as well as East and West white buildings (西白楼, 东白楼). Library, the Laboratory Building, the Info-tech Building and the stadium was built in the 1990s.

Notable alumni

Scientists
 Tsung-Dao LeeNAS CAS, theoretical physicist and Nobel Prize laureate
 Chien-Shiung WuNAS CAS, experimental physicist and Wolf Prize laureate
 Chien Wei-zangCAS, physicist 
 Hu NingCAS, theoretical physicist
 Feng DuanCAS, physicist
 Feng KangCAS, mathematician
 Yao ZhenCAS, biologist
 Xiaowei ZhuangNAS, biophysicist
 Tianxi Cai, biostatistician

Engineers
 Yuan-Cheng FungNAS NAE, bioengineer
 Shi Jun, chemical engineer
 Chia-Shun YihNAE, fluid mechanics engineer
 Ju-Chin Chu, chemical engineer and father of Steven Chu

Politicians
 Qin Bangxian, early leader of the CPC.
 Zhou Yongkang, party and state leader.
 Yuan Weimin, made contributions to Chinese sport.

Writers
 Wu Zuoren
 Lu Wenfu

Entrepreneurs
 President Yu Liang, of China Vanke Co.

Principals

Notes

References

Bibliographies

1035 establishments in Asia
Educational institutions established in the 11th century
High schools in Suzhou
11th-century establishments in China